Bolton is a locality in Victoria, Australia, located approximately  from Robinvale, Victoria.

Bolton Post Office opened on 17 July 1920 and closed in 1975.

References

Towns in Victoria (Australia)
Rural City of Swan Hill